Energy in Belarus describes energy and electricity production, consumption and import in Belarus. Belarus is a net energy importer. According to IEA, the energy import vastly exceeded the energy production in 2015, describing Belarus as one of the world's least energy sufficient countries in the world. Belarus is very dependent on Russia.

Total energy consumption (measured by total primary energy supply) in Belarus was 27.0 Mtoe in 2018, similar to consumption in Norway and Hungary. Primary energy use in Belarus was 327 TWh or 34 TWh per million persons in 2008.

Primary energy use per capita in Belarus in 2009 (34 MWh) was slightly more than in Portugal (26 MWh) and about half of the use in Belgium (64 MWh) or Sweden (62 MWh).

Overview

Power plants 

The Astravets Nuclear Power Plant is under construction, with the first unit of two expected to come online in 2020.

Natural gas 
The country is one of the world’s largest importers of natural gas with estimates for 2018 being about 17 Mtoe (20 billion cubic metres [bcm]) of natural gas, making it the leading importer among the so-called EU4Energy countries: Armenia, Azerbaijan, Belarus, Georgia, Kazakhstan, Kyrgyzstan, Moldova, Tajikistan, Turkmenistan, Ukraine and Uzbekistan. In 2018 almost all generated electricity came from natural gas (97%, or 39 terawatt hours [TWh]). In 1990, the IEA reported natural gas as constituting 52% of electricity generation, with oil generating 48%.

There are two large gas pipes running through Belarus, the Yamal–Europe pipeline and Northern Lights. In addition there is the Minsk–Kaliningrad Interconnection that connects to Kaliningrad.

Oil 

Belarus is a large oil refiner, listed 36th in the world, at 19 Mt of oil products in 2018 by the IEA. It has two refineries and oil pipelines built during the Soviet era including the Mozyr Oil Refinery.

Renewable energy 

Renewable energy generation accounted for 6% of Belarus’s energy in 2018, mostly from biofuels and waste. Renewables share in electricity generation was 2% in 2018 (0.8 TWh).

Storage 
Because non-nuclear thermal power plants are ramped up and down depending on heat requirements, and nuclear is not very flexible, increased battery storage has been suggested.

Subsidies 
Fossil fuelled heat is heavily subsidized.

See also 

 Map of Belarusian power grids
 Druzhba pipeline
 2004 Russia–Belarus gas dispute
 2007 Russia–Belarus energy dispute

References